Bonaberiana is a monotypic moth genus of the family Erebidae. Its only species, Bonaberiana crassisquama, is found in sub-Saharan Africa. Both the genus and species were first described by Strand in 1915.

References

Calpinae
Monotypic moth genera